Visible Speech is a system of phonetic symbols developed by British linguist Alexander Melville Bell in 1867 to represent the position of the speech organs in articulating sounds. Bell was known internationally as a teacher of speech and proper elocution and an author of books on the subject.  The system is composed of symbols that show the position and movement of the throat, tongue, and lips as they produce the sounds of language, and it is a type of phonetic notation.  The system was used to aid the deaf in learning to speak.

In 1864 Melville promoted his first works on Visible Speech, in order to help the deaf both learn and improve upon their speech (since the profoundly deaf could not hear their own pronunciation). To help promote the system, Bell created two written short forms using his system of 29 modifiers and tones, 52 consonants, 36 vowels and a dozen diphthongs: they were named World English, which was similar to the International Phonetic Alphabet, and also Line Writing, used as a shorthand form for stenographers.

Melville's works on Visible Speech became highly notable, and were described by Édouard Séguin as being "...a greater invention than the telephone by his son, Alexander Graham Bell". Melville saw numerous applications for his invention, including its worldwide use as a universal language.  However, although heavily promoted at the Second International Congress on Education of the Deaf in Milan, Italy in 1880, after a period of a dozen years or so in which it was applied to the education of the deaf, Visible Speech was found to be more cumbersome, and thus a hindrance, to the teaching of speech to the deaf, compared to other methods, and eventually faded from use.

Bell's son Alexander Graham Bell learned the symbols, assisted his father in giving public demonstrations of the system and mastered it to the point that he later improved upon his father's work.  Eventually, Alexander Graham Bell became a powerful advocate of visible speech and oralism in the United States.  The money he earned from his patent of the telephone and the sale of his Volta Laboratory patents helped him to pursue this mission.

The early years 

In 1867, Alexander Melville Bell published the book Visible Speech: The Science of Universal Alphabetics. This book contains information about the system of symbols he created that, when used to write words, indicated pronunciation so accurately, that it could even reflect regional accents. A person reading a piece of text handwritten in Melville Bell's system of characters could accurately reproduce a sentence the way it would be spoken by someone with a foreign or regional accent. In his demonstrations, Melville Bell employed his son, Alexander Graham Bell to read from the visible speech transcript of the volunteer's spoken words and would astound the audience by saying it back exactly as the volunteer had spoken it.

A few samples of the writing system invented by Melville Bell may be seen in the images on this page. These images depict Melville Bell's intention of creating a script in which the characters actually look like the position of the mouth when speaking them out loud. The system is useful not only because its visual representation mimicks the physical act of speaking, but because it does so, these symbols may be used to write words in any language, hence the name "Universal Alphabetics".

Melville Bell's system was effective at helping deaf people improve their pronunciation, but his son Graham Bell decided to improve upon his father's invention by creating a system of writing that was even more accurate and employed the most advanced technology of the time.

A fresh take on pronunciation for the deaf 

Alexander Graham Bell later devised another system of visual cues that also came to be known as visible speech, yet this system did not use symbols written on paper to teach deaf people how to pronounce words. Instead, Graham Bell's system, developed at his Volta Laboratory in Washington, D.C., involved the use of a spectrogram, a device that makes "visible records of the frequency, intensity, and time analysis of short samples of speech". The spectrogram translated sounds into readable patterns via a photographic process. This system was based on the idea that the eye should be able to read patterns of vocalizations in much the same way that the ear translates these vocalizations into meaning. Modern implementations of Bell's idea display sound spectra in real time and are used in phonology, speech therapy and computer speech recognition.

Method 

The idea of the use of a spectrograph to translate speech into a visual representation (a spectrogram) was created in the hopes of enabling the deaf to use a telephone. If the sounds could be translated into something readable, then a deaf person at the receiving end could then read out the pattern of speech to determine its meaning without having to hear what was said. The spectrograph readings could also be used to teach pronunciation by having a person speak into the spectrograph and watch a small television-like screen to monitor the precision of their utterances.

See also 

 International English
 Second International Congress on Education of the Deaf
 Universal language
 Volta Laboratory and Bureau
 Hangul

Notes

References 
 Kopp. Visible Speech Manual, Wayne State University Press, Detroit, 1967. ISBN HV 2490 K83+
 Potter, Kopp, Kopp. Visible Speech, Dover Publications, 1966. ISBN TK 6500 P86 1966.
 Bell, Alexander Melville. Visible Speech: The Science of Universal Alphabetics, Simkin, Marshall & Co., London, 1867.
 Winzer, Margret A. The History Of Special Education: From Isolation To Integration. Washington, DC: Gallaudet University Press, 1993. .

External links 

 Visible Speech with IPA equivalents (Omniglot.com)
 Visible Speech as a Means of Communicating Articulation to Deaf Mutes (American Memory: Alexander Graham Bell Family Papers)
 Description and Overview of Visible Speech, with fonts
  Visible Speech, by Alex M. Bell through Google books
  Primer of Phonetics, by Henry Sweet through Google books. A manual on Sweet's revision of Visible Speech, Organic Speech

Phonetic alphabets
Alexander Graham Bell
Deafness
Special education
1867 introductions